is a retired Japanese athlete who specialised in sprinting events. He represented his country at the 1992 and 1996 Summer Olympics as well as four World Championships. His best individual success was reaching the semifinals at the 1993 World Championships in Stuttgart. He became the first Japanese to reach the 100 metres semifinal at the World Championships. He was the former Japanese record holder in the 100 metres and 200 metres, and a two-time Japanese Championships champion in the 100 metres. He played gymnastics before turning to athletics.

Competition record

National titles
Japanese Championships
100 m: 1993, 1994

Personal bests
Outdoor
100 metres – 10.20 (+0.5 m/s, Tokyo 1991): Former national record
200 metres – 20.72 (+0.4 m/s, Tokyo 1993): Former national record

Indoor
60 metres – 6.71 (Bielefeld 1998)

References

1971 births
Living people
People from Kishiwada, Osaka
Sportspeople from Osaka Prefecture
Japanese male sprinters
Olympic male sprinters
Olympic athletes of Japan
Athletes (track and field) at the 1992 Summer Olympics
Athletes (track and field) at the 1996 Summer Olympics
Asian Games gold medalists for Japan
Asian Games medalists in athletics (track and field)
Athletes (track and field) at the 1994 Asian Games
Medalists at the 1994 Asian Games
Universiade silver medalists for Japan
Universiade medalists in athletics (track and field)
Medalists at the 1993 Summer Universiade
World Athletics Championships athletes for Japan
Japan Championships in Athletics winners